, known professionally as  and sometimes as Shigeru BROWN, is a Japanese singer and actor. He is most known in the West for his contributions to the Katamari Damacy soundtrack, performing the theme songs of Nerima Daikon Brothers and acting as its lead character, and playing the title character in the film adaptation of Space Adventure Cobra.

Matsuzaki is left-handed, as seen whenever he plays bass or guitar, his string instruments are usually tuned with the lower E string at the bottom. He has also collaborated with the popular music group Momoiro Clover Z.

Matsuzaki is also a baseball fan, having sung the theme song of the Saitama Seibu Lions of the NPB that began to be used when they moved to Tokorozawa in 1979. In an interview with Weekly Baseball, he said that he "loved drinking whiskey behind the net at the Seibu Dome."

Discography
Yes or No (1991)
 (1994)
 (2000)
Old Fashion Love Song (2000)
 (2003)
My Favorite Songs (2005) 
Yes We Can!! (2009)
Shigeru Matsuzaki All Time Best “Old & New”～I'm a Singer～ (2011)

Black on Black (2014)

Selected filmography
Space Adventure Cobra (1982)
Ponytail wa Furimukanai (1985)
Chōshichirō Edo Nikki (1987)
Bikkuriman 2000 (1999)
Cromartie High School (2005)
Fugo Keiji (2005)
Nerima Daikon Brothers (2006)
Tokyo Girl (2008)
Dead Sushi (2012)

References

External links

Shigeru Matsuzaki official blog

1949 births
Japanese male film actors
Japanese male singers
Japanese radio personalities
Japanese television personalities
Japanese television presenters
Living people
People from Edogawa, Tokyo
Victor Entertainment artists
20th-century Japanese male actors
21st-century Japanese male actors